Buzynyata is a rural locality (a village) in Vereshchaginsky District, Perm Krai, Russia. The population was 6 as of 2010. There are 2 streets.

Geography 
Buzynyata is located 9 km east of Vereshchagino (the district's administrative centre) by road. Peleni is the nearest rural locality.

References 

Rural localities in Vereshchaginsky District